Let's Go to My Star is the first album by South Korean singer and actress Lee Jung-hyun. The album was released in October 1999, and spawned the hit singles "Wa" and "Change".

Track listing
Track listing and credits adapted from Melon and the Korea Music Copyright Association song database.

Miscellanea

 GX 339-4 is the name of a black hole candidate.
 "I Love X" features rapper Jo PD and is remixed in an uncensored form on PSY's first album as "I Love Sex."

References

1999 debut albums
Lee Jung-hyun albums
Korean-language albums